Brian Whelan (born 3 May 1957) is an Irish painter, author and playwright.

Early life
Whelan was born in Ealing, West London, UK, of Irish Roman Catholic parents. His childhood was spent both in London and Ireland (Kilkenny Waterford and Dublin). After his training at Kingston Polytechnic College and the Royal Academy of Arts, he lived and worked for 30 years in various parts of Norfolk and Suffolk, England. These early years were spent painting, organizing various multi-disciplined art events and making films.

Career
Whelan first came to the attention of the public and media in a fringe event connected to the Aldeburgh Festival in 2000 with an exhibition entitled "The Church Pub" with co artist Andrew Smith. Whelan's half of the exhibition went on to the Hammersmith Irish Art Centre in London (now called the Irish Cultural Centre). Over the next two years (2001-2), the exhibition was held at several other London venues including: St Benedict's Abbey in Ealing, Spotlight and Broadway Galleries in Lewisham, and Irish Club in Eaton Square. John Hegarty of the Montfort Brothers of St. Gabriel commissioned Whelan to paint a portrait of their spiritual founder, Louis de Montfort. The painting is permanently hung at the Montfort Missionaries  in Czestochowa, Poland.

Later years in England were devoted to exhibiting his works throughout England (St Edmundsbury Cathedral, Norwich Cathedral, St Benedict's Abbey) and internationally (Spain, China, United States) and writing books. 
From 2013 - 2019, he and his American wife Wendy Roseberry had lived in the historic village of Waterford, Virginia, USA, where they had created a studio out of an old outbuilding.

Since 2020, they have lived in Connecticut, USA. The studio is in a former horse stable.

Works and exhibitions
The year 2021 includes exhibitions at the Silvermine Art Center and
Westport River Gallery in Connecticut and The Paula Friedman Art Gallery and
Verostko Center  in Pennsylvania. Pauly Friedman Art Gallery - Misericordia
University. Whelan joined fellow London Royal Academy of Art alumni in the 'Legacy' exhibition held at the Minories Galleries in Colchester, England, UK in 2019.

In 2018, the Green Curtain Theatre Company staged in London, Whelan's play "A Tragic Carmody" based on his experience with the late artist Daniel Carmody.
Also in 2018, art collector John Kohan profiled Whelan and Whelan's works that Kohan has purchased for his religious art collection.

Washington National Cathedral invited Whelan to again exhibit in 2016. Nine paintings on the subject of Holy City, a celebration of the three Abrahamic faiths: Judaism, Christianity and Islam. The installation placed in the north transept was to mark the 15th year since the 9/11 attacks.

Norwich Cathedral in Norfolk England commissioned Whelan to paint 14 panels of the spiritual life and death of International Red Cross nurse Edith Cavell in 2014. The panels on which the scenes of The Passion of Edith Cavell were painted, were first exhibited at Washington National Cathedral in the US to mark 100 years since the beginning of WW1.  The paintings later in the following year traveled to Brussels Roman Catholic Cathedral and Cathedral of St. Michael and St. Gudula (close to Schaerbeek, where Edith Cavell was executed) before continuing its journey to Norfolk for permanent installation of the 14 panels at Norwich Cathedral to coincide with the 100th anniversary of Cavell's execution, in October 2015.

Whelan's painting The Martyrdom of St. Edmund permanently hangs in the Lady Chapel of St. Edmundsbury Cathedral in Bury St. Edmund, England and "Holy City with Herald" at the Hostal dos Reis Catolicos in Santiago de Compostella.

His images are used on the cover and contents of The Popes 2009 CD Outlaw Heaven and 2012 CD New Chuch as well as five releases from London Irish punk folker Anto Morra since 2013 until present day.

In summer 2009, Whelan co-curated The Quiet Men – London Irish Painters, the first major international tour (UK, Spain and US) of contemporary London Irish art. At the PM Gallery in Ealing, London Whelan first showed his large (2.7 m × 3.6 m) polyptych Transmetropolitan painting – an immigrants' joyride across the city of London and reference to the song of the same name by Shane MacGowen.In addition to Whelan's work, The Quiet Men tour included paintings by four other London Irish painters: Bernard Canavan, John Duffin,
Dermot Holland and the late Daniel Carmody. The book by the same name published by The Irish World Newspaper was launched in 2010 by the Irish Embassy in London.

References

Living people
Religious artists
20th-century Irish painters
1957 births
English people of Irish descent
21st-century Irish painters
Irish male painters
People from Ealing
Painters from London
20th-century Irish male artists